Araraquara ( or ) is a city in the state of São Paulo in Brazil. It is also known as "the abode of the sun," because of its impressive sunset and because of its hot atmosphere, especially in summer. The city was founded in 1817.

History

Etymology
There are two possible origins for the name of the city, one that links it to the Tupi-Guarani language of the region's indigenous inhabitants, and one that relates it to the Língua Geral of São Paulo. The two versions come from similar expressions, "arará kûara" and "arara kûara", which mean "lair of the macaws."

Geography
The city is in the Microregion of Araraquara, part of the Mesoregion of Araraquara, 270 km north of São Paulo.

Transport
The city is served by Bartolomeu de Gusmão Airport.

Sport
Ferroviária is the local football (soccer) team of the city organized back in 1950 by the railroad workers at EFA – Araraquara Railroad Company (Estradas de Ferro de Araraquara). The team is known as "Locomotives" and plays home matches at Estádio Fonte Luminosa, which has a maximum capacity of 27,000 people (seated).

Ferroviária has also a very competitive professional female soccer team organized in 2001 that started to collect titles right on the following year – the Ferroviária Women Soccer team got its first state title in 2002 – the São Paulo State championship. Ladies did it again in 2004, 2005 and 2013 to sum up four state titles. The Ferroviaria women soccer team kept evolving in structure to get national projection – women soccer team won in 2014 the Copa do Brasil and more two national titles the Brasileirão in 2014 and 2019. They also reached two most important titles for the women soccer in Americas. In March 2021, the Ferroviaria Women soccer team won its second title of Libertadores da America championship in 2020 edition (due to COVID-19 limitations). The first title at Libertadores da America came on 2015. Lindsay Camila is the Ferrroviaria Women Soccer team coach.

Notes

References

External links

 Official website

 
Populated places established in 1817
1817 establishments in Brazil